John Lynch, (aka John Lynch fitz John), fifth Mayor of Galway, 1489-1490.

Believed to be a brother of the first two mayors, little is known of Lynch's term of office. He was married to Secilia Stywyn, and the couple had at least five children: Henry, Secilia, Ambrose, Sander and Balthasser. He was alive as late as 1498, and his will requested that his wife and his brother Nicholas be his executors, while My body to be buried in the Chapel of the Blessed Virgin Mary in the Collegiate Church of Galway.

References
 History of Galway, James Hardiman, Galway, 1820.
 Old Galway, Maureen Donovan O'Sullivan, 1942.
 Henry, William (2002). Role of Honour: The Mayors of Galway City 1485-2001. Galway: Galway City Council.  
 Martyn, Adrian (2016). The Tribes of Galway: 1124-1642

Mayors of Galway
15th-century Irish politicians